The men's tandem event was part of the track cycling programme at the 1920 Summer Olympics.

Results

Quarterfinals

Quarterfinal 1

Quarterfinal 2

Quarterfinal 3

Quarterfinal 4

Semifinals

Semifinal 1

Semifinal 2

Final

Bronze medal match

References

External links
 
 

Men's tandem
Track cycling at the 1920 Summer Olympics
Cycling at the Summer Olympics – Men's tandem